John Leonard Thorn (born 28 April 1925) is a writer and educational consultant. He was headmaster of Repton School from 1961 to 1968 and then of Winchester College until 1985. He was chairman of the Headmasters' Conference for 1981.

Early life
The son of Stanley and Winifred Thorn, Thorn was educated at St Paul's School, London, and at Corpus Christi College, Cambridge.

Career 

Leaving school during the Second World War, Thorn joined the Royal Naval Volunteer Reserve, in which he served as a Sub-Lieutenant from 1943 to 1946. On returning to civilian life, he took up a place at Corpus Christi College, Cambridge, graduating in 1949, and was then an assistant schoolmaster at Clifton from 1949 until being appointed headmaster of Repton in 1961. From 1968 until 1985 he was headmaster of Winchester College. In 1981, he was Chairman of the Headmasters' Conference.

After his retirement from Winchester, where he has continued to live, Thorn was an educational consultant and also a writer, as well as serving on a number of public and charitable bodies. He was a director of the Royal Opera House, Covent Garden, from 1971 to 1976; a Trustee of the British Museum from 1980 to 1985, and of the Winchester Cathedral Trust, from 1986 to 1989; vice-chairman of the Hampshire Buildings Preservation Trust from 1989 to 1992, then its chairman until 1996; for some years he served on the executive committee of the Cancer Research Campaign. He was chairman of governors of Abingdon School from 1991 to 1994 and was also a governor of Oakham School and of Stowe School during the 1980s. Thorn continued to teach including A-level philosophy classes at King Edward VI School in Southampton in the late 1990s.

Key values as Headmaster 

Thorn's 1989 autobiography clarifies his key concerns as a public-school headmaster. He aimed to humanise the sometimes intolerant, sport-dominated culture of traditional boys-only public schools of his time. Alongside promoting exam-focused academic attainment, he sought also to stimulate his pupils’ creative capacities and to use part of the curriculum to develop their understanding of the world for its own sake. Egalitarian in outlook, he strove to expand access to his schools for pupils whose parents could not afford the fees.

Progressive reform 

At Repton Thorn hoped to make the boys more "industrious, creative and happy" in a school where, he felt, sport overshadowed everything else, academic attainment included, and which he saw as "a rather brutal place" for boys not suited to the dominant school culture. He sought to reduce corporal punishment and abolished "personal fagging", a Repton practice whereby the youngest pupils were assigned for two years as servants for the most senior boys, who could beat them for mistakes. After moving to Winchester College in 1968, Thorn found less need to address such traditional public-school austerities because, inspired by the late 1960s 'Counter-Culture', senior boys were themselves refusing to continue them. Thorn also opposed the traditional dominance of school sport. "The arts must no longer be Cinderellas", he wrote, "must no longer take second place to cricket nets and the rest of it". He viewed such challenges to Repton's traditions as the fundamental source of such strong hostility from a cohesive faction of conservative, sport-focused teachers, that he sought to leave Repton.

Participatory arts 

At Repton Thorn expanded the roles and resources of the established lead drama teacher and lead art teacher, praising their work as cultivating creativity and sensitivity. Inspired by their methods, at Winchester he developed participatory arts as a valued part of school life, creating a theatre workshop and an art school there. For Thorn, the most valuable aspects of school drama, art or music was pupils' participation and experience of the creative process rather than a polished product. He warmed to experimental plays written or produced by pupils themselves. Thorn also made space in the curriculum for academic study, separate from exam subjects, which aimed purely to expand pupils’ perspective on the world. At Winchester he explored a combination of history, literature, philosophy, politics and science for this purpose.

Subsidised places 

A sometime Labour voter, Thorn was strongly concerned to share his schools with pupils whose parents could not afford the fees. He was keen to co-operate with government schemes for assisted places. He sold Winchester College's 15th century manuscript of Malory's Morte d’Arthur to the British Library in order to fund bursaries for poorer pupils. He modified Winchester's demanding entrance scholarship exams to give talented state school pupils a fairer chance against competitors who had received expensive coaching.

John Smyth affair 

While Thorn was at Winchester, John Smyth, a barrister who lived nearby, acquired a dominant and unhealthy role in the School's Christian Forum.  Smyth persuaded some 16 Winchester boys to undergo severe beatings as a kind of penance.  Thorn knew that boys were visiting Smyth at his home but for some years was unaware of what was happening there.  When Smyth was exposed in 1982 Thorn got him to sign an undertaking that he would not contact young people in future, but did not inform the police.  Smyth later moved to Southern Africa where he resumed his activities.   In 2019 Winchester College commissioned an independent review into Smyth's involvement with the School.   Thorn, now in his mid 90s, was not well enough to contribute.

Personal life
In 1955, Thorn married Veronica Laura, daughter of the barrister Sir Robert Maconochie OBE QC, and they had one son and one daughter. His wife died in 1999.

In 1989 he published an autobiography, The Road to Winchester. 
Now in his nineties, he is a member of the Garrick Club and resides in Winchester.

Publications
A History of England (1961, contributor)
The Road to Winchester (1989, autobiography)

References

1925 births
Living people
Alumni of Corpus Christi College, Cambridge
People educated at St Paul's School, London
Royal Navy officers of World War II
Headmasters of Repton School
Headmasters of Winchester College
Royal Naval Volunteer Reserve personnel of World War II
Governors of Abingdon School